The Tin Hau Temple in Joss House Bay, sometimes referred to as Tai Miu, is Hong Kong's oldest and largest Tin Hau Temple. It is also said to be the most popular Tin Hau temple both for fishermen and for others in Hong Kong.

Location
The sea-facing temple is located at Fat Tong Mun, on the shore of Joss House Bay, near the south end of Clear Water Bay Peninsula. Joss House Bay derives its name from the temple, or joss house. The Chinese name of Joss House Bay, Tai Miu Wan, literally means "the bay of the large temple".

History
The temple is said to have been built in 1266 by Lam Tao-yi. There is a rock nearby, that was carved in 1274. It bears the oldest dated inscription known in Hong Kong.

Tin Hau Festival and events
Once a year, on Tin Hau's birthday, the 23rd of the third moon on the Chinese calendar, upwards of 40,000 to 50,000 people attend celebrations at the temple. Thousands of people hike their way, via the High Junk Peak Hiking Trail, to the Temple to pay their respects. Thousands of others sail into Joss House Bay in hundreds of vessels.

The police have the launching ceremony of their new cruisers held at the temple.

Conservation
The temple was managed by the Lam clan until 1939. Since them, it has been managed by the Chinese Temples Committee. It is a Grade I historic building.

Access
The temple is accessible via the High Junk Peak Hiking Trail. A shorter walk combined with public transportation is possible from the Clear Water Bay Country Club.

A ferry service to Joss House Bay is available annually from North Point Ferry Pier on the day of Tin Hau's birthday. Joss House Bay Public Pier is located just in front of the temple.

Outside the Tin Hau Birthday Celebration, a regular green minibus (Route 16) operates between MTR Po Lam station Public Transport Interchange and Po Toi O. Visitors should alight at the Tai Miu Wan stop (near the entrance to Clearwater Bay Golf & Country Club) and walk for about 10 minutes down a flight of stairs to Joss House Bay, passing the rock inscription on the way down.

References

External links

 Pictures of the temple

Clear Water Bay Peninsula
Tin Hau temples in Hong Kong
Grade I historic buildings in Hong Kong